The 2020 World Rugby Under 20 Trophy had to be the 13th annual international rugby union competition for Under 20 national teams, second-tier world championship.

The championship was cancelled due to the COVID-19 pandemic.

Qualified teams 
A total of eight teams will play in the tournament. The host  and the 2019 World Rugby Under 20 Championship relegation country  qualify automatically. The remaining six countries will qualify through a qualification process in regional competitions (North America, South America, Europe, Africa, Asia, Oceania).

Host (1)
 
Relegated from 2019 JWC
 
Asia Rugby (1)
  
 Rugby Africa (1)
 

Sudamérica Rugby (1)
 
Rugby Americas North (1)
 
Rugby Europe (1)
 
Oceania Rugby (1)

References

2020
2019 rugby union tournaments for national teams
rugby union
International rugby union competitions hosted by Spain
World Rugby Under 20 Trophy
World Rugby Under 20 Trophy